James Rodríguez (born 1991) is a Colombian footballer.

James Rodríguez may also refer to:

 James Roday Rodriguez (James David Rodriguez, born 1976), American actor
 James H. Rodriguez Elementary, an elementary school in New Mexico, U.S.

See also
Jaime Rodríguez (born 1959), El Salvadorian footballer
Jaime Rodríguez Calderón (born 1957), Mexican politician